Stefano Pellegrini (born 6 July 1967) is an Italian former professional footballer who played as a defender.

Career
Pellegrini was born in Varese. He played for 8 seasons (121 games, 2 goals) in the Serie A for U.C. Sampdoria, A.S. Roma and Udinese Calcio.

Personal life
His older brothers Luca Pellegrini and Davide Pellegrini also played football professionally. To distinguish them, Luca was referred to as Pellegrini I, Davide as Pellegrini II and Stefano as Pellegrini III.

Honours
Roma
 Coppa Italia: 1990–91

External links

1967 births
Living people
Italian footballers
Association football defenders
Serie A players
Serie B players
Serie C players
S.S.D. Varese Calcio players
A.C. Monza players
U.C. Sampdoria players
A.S. Roma players
Udinese Calcio players
Modena F.C. players
A.C. Carpi players
AC Bellinzona players
Italian expatriate footballers
Expatriate footballers in Switzerland
Italian expatriate sportspeople in Switzerland